Czech Game of the Year Awards are annual awards that recognize accomplishments in video game development in the Czech Republic. The awards began as part of Gameday Festival in 2010, but became independent from the festival in 2017. The awards are organised by the České Hry association.

2010 
The awards for the first year were presented on 7 May 2011. Awards were given in three categories. Mafia II was awarded as the best Czech game in Czech. The jury also expressed recognition to Centauri Production for making their games in Czech. Samurai II: Vengeance was awarded as the best Czech game for Mobile devices and best Czech artistic achievement in game creation.
 Best Czech artistic achievement in game creation - Madfinger Games for Samurai II: Vengeance
 Best Czech Game in Czech - 2K Czech for Mafia II
 Best Czech Game for Mobile Devices - Madfinger Games for Samurai II:Vengeance

2011 
The 2011 awards were presented on 3 May 2012.
 Best Czech artistic achievement in game creation - Allodium for Infinitum
 Best Czech Game in Czech - Hammerware for Family Farm
 Best Czech Game for Mobile Devices - Madfinger Games for Shadowgun

2012 
The 2012 awards were presented on 3 May 2013. Only two categories were awarded this time.
 The Technical Contribution to Czech Video Game Creation - Madfinger Games for Dead Trigger and Shadowgun: Deadzone
 Nominated:  Keen Software House for Miner Wars 2081, SCS Software for Euro Truck Simulator 2 and Scania Truck Driving Simulator
 The Artistic Contribution to Czech Video Game Creation - Amanita Design for Botanicula
 Nominated: Hammerware for Good Folks, Rake in Grass for Northmark: Hour of the Wolf, and Lonely Sock for Coral City

2013 
The 2013 awards were presented on 10 May 2014.
 The Technical Contribution to Czech Video Game Creation - Bohemia Interactive for ArmA III
 Nominated: Hyperbolic Magnetism for Lums: The Game of Light and Shadows, Keen Software House for Space Engineers and Madfinger Games for Dead Trigger 2
 The Artistic Contribution to Czech Video Game Creation - Hyperbolic Magnetism for Lums: The Game of Light and Shadows
 Nominated: Hexage for Reaper: Tale of a Pale Swordsman, Silicon Jelly for Mimpi and Trickster Arts for Hero of Many

2014 
The 2014 awards were presented on 8 May 2015. There were four categories.
 The Technical Contribution to Czech Video Game Creation - Keen Software House for Medieval Engineers
 Nominated: Allodium for Infinitum: Battle for Europe, Keen Software House for Medieval Engineers and Cinemax for The Keep
 The Artistic Contribution to Czech Video Game Creation - Dreadlocks Ltd for Dex
 Nominated: ARK8 for Coraabia, Icarus Games for Time Treasury and CBE Software for J.U.L.I.A. Among the Stars
 The Best Original Game - Madfinger Games for Monzo
 Nominated: Dreadlocks Ltd for Dex, Czech Games Edition for Galaxy Trucker and Allodium for Infinitum: Battle for Europe
 The Best Debut Game - ARK8 for Coraabia
 Nominated: Czech Games Edition for Galaxy Trucker, Digital Life productions for Soccerinho and CZ.NIC for Tablexia

2015 
The 2015 awards were presented on 6 May 2016.
 The Technical Contribution to Czech Video Game Creation - Wube Software for Factorio
 Nominated: BadFly Interactive for Dead Effect 2, McMagic Productions for Novus Inceptio and Madfinger Games for Unkilled
 The Artistic Contribution to Czech Video Game Creation - Hangonit for Rememoried
 Nominated: Fiolasoft Studio for Blackhole, Silicon Jelly for Mimpi Dreams and Lukáš Navrátil for Toby: The Secret Mine
 The Best Original Game - Wube Software for Factorio
 Nominated: Fiolasoft Studio for Blackhole, Charles University for Czechoslovakia 38–89: The Assassination and Lipa Learning for Lipa Theater
 The Best Debut Game - Charles University for Czechoslovakia 38–89: The Assassination
 Nominated: Wube Software for Factorio, McMagic Productions for Novus Inceptio and Lukáš Navrátil for Toby: The Secret Mine

2016
The 2016 awards were presented on 10 February 2017. It was held in Prague for the first time and wasn't part of Gameday. There were 9 categories this time. Nominations were scheduled to be announced on 24 January 2017 but it was pushed to 27 January 2017. Dark Train and Samorost 3 garnered the most nominations at 6 categories each. Chameleon Run was nominated in 5 categories and American Truck Simulator earned 4 nominations. Samorost 3 won the top award as well as two others.
 Czech game of the year - Samorost 3 by Amanita Design
 Nominated: American Truck Simulator, Chameleon Run and Dark Train
 Czech game of the year for PC/Consoles - Samorost 3 by Amanita Design
 Nominated: American Truck Simulator, Dark Train and Void Raiders
 Czech game of the year for Mobile Devices -  Chameleon Run by Hyperbolic Magnetism
 Nominated: Hackers, Redcon (video game) and Tiny Miners
 Best technological solution - American Truck Simulator by SCS Software
 Nominated: Chameleon Run, Killing Room and Space Merchants: Arena
 Best audio - Samorost 3 by Amanita Design
 Nominated: American Truck Simulator, Dark Train and The Solus Project
 Best Game Design - Chameleon Run by Hyperbolic Magnetism
 Nominated: Dark Train, Samorost 3 and Trupki
 Best Story - 7 Mages by Napoleon Games
 Nominated: Dark Train, Samorost 3 and The Solus Project
 Best Visual - Dark Train by Paperash Studio
 Nominated: Chameleon Run, Samorost 3 and The Solus Project
 Biggest Hope - WarFriends by About Fun
 Nominated: Blue Effect, Legends of Azulgar and Project ARGO
 Hall of Fame - František Fuka, Tomáš Rylek and Miroslav Fídler

2017
The 2017 awards were presented on 23 May 2018. Educational game by Charles University Attentat 1942 has won 3 categories including the main award.
 Czech game of the year - Attentat 1942
 Nominated: Skylar & Plux: Adventure on Clover Island, Smashing Four, WarFriends
 Czech game of the year for PC/Consoles - Attentat 1942
 Nominated: Blue Effect, Skylar & Plux: Adventure on Clover Island, Take On Mars
 Czech game of the year for Mobile Devices - WarFriends
 Nominated: AirportPRG, Smashing Four, What the Hen!
 Best technological solution - Shadowgun Legends
 Nominated: Blue Effect, Mashinky, Ylands
 Best audio - Blue Effect
 Nominated: Attentat 1942, Skylar & Plux: Adventure on Clover Island, Under Leaves
 Best Game Design - Mashinky
 Nominated: AirportPRG, Smashing Four, Through the Ages
 Best Story - Attentat 1942
 Nominated: Erin: The Last Aos Sí, Ghostory, The Naked Game
 Best Visual - Under Leaves
 Nominated: Shadowgun Legends, Tragedy of Prince Rupert, Ylands
 Biggest Hope - Mashinky
 Nominated: Children of the Galaxy, Shadowgun Legends, Ylands
 Hall of Fame - Martin Klíma

2018
The 2018 awards were presented on 5 April 2019, hosted by Tomáš Hanák. Nominations were announced on 28 March 2019. Kingdom Come: Deliverance and Beat Saber received highest number of nominations. Kingdom Come: Deliverance was seen as a front runner and has won highest number of awards winning 3 categories - Youtubers Award, Best Game Design and Best technological solution but lost to Beat Saber in the main award category. Beat Saber also won Game Journalists Award. Chuchel won Best Game Design award. 
 Developer's Award - Main Award: Beat Saber
 Nominated: Chuchel, DayZ, Kingdom Come: Deliverance
 Game Journalists Award: Beat Saber
 Nominated: Heroes of Flatlandia, Aggressors: Ancient Rome,  Kingdom Come: Deliverance
 Youtubers Award: Kingdom Come: Deliverance
 Nominated: Band of Defenders, Beat Saber, DayZ
 Audiovisual Execution: Chuchel
 Nominated: Project Hospital, Beat Saber, Kingdom Come: Deliverance
 Best Game Design: Kingdom Come: Deliverance
 Nominated: The Apartment, Beat Saber, DayZ
 Best technological solution: Kingdom Come: Deliverance
 Nominated: Mothergunship, Frontier Pilot Simulator, Beat Saber
 Hall of Fame: Tomáš Smutný and Eduard Smutný

2019
The 2019 awards were set for 20 March 2020, but were postponed due to the COVID-19 pandemic. A new date was announced on 13 July 2020, with the show scheduled to be held on 25 September 2020. Pilgrims by Amanita Design has eventually won the main award. Ylands by Bohemia Interactive won 2 awards - for Best technological solution and Best Free to Play game.
 Czech game of the Year - Main Award: Pilgrims
 Nominated: Ylands, Vigor, Planet Nomads
 Audiovisual Execution: Feudal Alloy
 Nominated: Little Mouse's Encyclopedia, Pilgrims, Zeminátor
 Best Game Design: Monolisk
 Nominated: Ylands, Jim is Moving Out!, Time, Space and Matter
 Best technological solution: Ylands
 Nominated:  Vigor, Flippy Friends AR Multiplayer, Planet Nomads
 Free to Play: Ylands
 Nominated: Ritual: Sorcerer Angel, Vigor, Idle Quest Heroes
 Student game: Silicomrades
 Hall of Fame: Andrej Anastasov

2020
The 2020 awards were held on 8 December 2021. It was linked with a survey about best Czech game of 2010s. Kingdom Come: Deliverance was voted best Czech video game of 2010s. Creaks won the main award.

 Czech game of 2020: Creaks 
 Best technological solution: Mafia: Definitive Edition
 Best Game Design: Someday You'll Return
 Audiovisual Execution: Creaks 
 Free to Play: Shadowgun War Games
 Hall of Fame: Lukáš Ladra
 Czech game of the Decade: Kingdom Come: Deliverance

2021
The 2021 awards will be held on 6 December 2022.

 Czech game of 2021: Svoboda 1945: Liberation
 Best technological solution: Nebuchadnezzar
 Best Game Design: Hobo: Tough Life
 Audiovisual Execution: Happy Game
 Free to Play: Mini DayZ 2
 Hall of Fame: Marek Španěl
 Student Game: HATS!
 Best Community Support: Euro Truck Simulator 2

References

External links
 Official website 

Video gaming in the Czech Republic
Czech awards
Awards established in 2010
Video game awards
Anifilm